Nicolas Alexis Anthony Belloni (born 7 February 2001) is an Argentine footballer who plays as a forward for Italian  club Latina on loan from Pescara.

Club career
He made his Serie B debut for Pescara on 17 October 2020 in a game against Empoli. He substituted Miloš Bočić in the 82nd minute. He made his first start on 2 November in a game against Lecce.

On 31 August 2021, he joined Serie C club Imolese on a season-long loan. On 26 July 2022, Belloni was loaned to Potenza. On 5 January 2023, he moved on a new loan to Latina.

References

External links
 

2001 births
Living people
Footballers from Buenos Aires
Argentine people of Italian descent
Argentine footballers
Association football forwards
Serie B players
Serie C players
Delfino Pescara 1936 players
Imolese Calcio 1919 players
Potenza Calcio players
Latina Calcio 1932 players
Argentine expatriate footballers
Argentine expatriate sportspeople in Italy
Expatriate footballers in Italy